Volley Pesaro is an Italian women's volleyball club based in Pesaro currently playing in the Serie A1. The club won three Italian leagues and international titles.

Previous names
Due to sponsorship, the club have competed under the following names:
 Fiam ITA Meta Pesaro (2000–2001)
 Vitrifrigo Fiam Italia Pesaro (2001–2003)
 Scavolini Pesaro (2003–2012)
 Robursport Volley Pesaro (2012–2013)
 myCicero Pesaro (2013–2017)
 myCicero Volley Pesaro (2017–present)

History
The club was created in 1967 and made its way from regional tournaments during the 1970s to the national leagues in the 1980s and 1990s. It reached the Serie A1 (highest Italian league) in 2003. Home games took place at the PalaCampanara and success soon followed, with the club winning its first major title, the CEV Challenge Cup in 2005–06. Since then, three successive Serie A1 titles, one Italian Cup, four Italian Supercups and a CEV Cup title were added in just four years. The club also played in five editions of the CEV Women's Champions League.

In 2013 the club withdrew from the Serie A1 and along with Snoopy Pallavolo (another volleyball club from Pesaro) started a project called  which apart from the professional level has also the goal of focusing on youth players.

In 2017 the club returned to the Serie A1, after winning the promotion playoffs of the 2016–17 Serie A2.

Team

Season 2017–2018, as of September 2017.

Notable players

  Sheilla Castro (2004–2008)
  Marianne Steinbrecher (2006–2008)
  Jaqueline Carvalho (2008–2009)
  Antonella Del Core (2003–2006)
  Nadia Centoni (2003–2005)
  Simona Rinieri (2004–2006)
  Carolina Costagrande (2005–2010)
  Kinga Maculewicz (2005–2007)
  Lindsey Berg (2004–2007)
  Christiane Fürst (2007–2009)
  Katarzyna Skowrońska (2008–2010)
  Elke Wijnhoven (2007–2010)

Honours

National competitions
  National League: 3
2007–08, 2008–09, 2009–10

  Coppa Italia: 1
2008–09

  Italian Super Cup: 4
2006, 2008, 2009, 2010

International competitions
  CEV Cup: 1
2007–08

  CEV Challenge Cup: 1
2005–06

References

External links

Official website 

Italian women's volleyball clubs
Volleyball clubs established in 1967
1967 establishments in Italy
Sport in Pesaro
Sport in le Marche
Serie A1 (women's volleyball) clubs